Philip Young may refer to the following people:

Philip Young (ambassador) (1910–1987), American diplomat
Philip Young (security officer), convicted of murder in Afghanistan
Philip E. Young, founder of Titleist
Philip Young (MP), Member of Parliament (MP) for Shropshire
Phil Young, Australian rugby league player
Phil Young (writer), Irish writer
Philip Yonge or Young (1709–1783), British clergyman